The 2014 Alabama Crimson Tide softball team is an American softball team, representing the University of Alabama for the 2014 NCAA softball season. The Crimson Tide played their home games at Rhoads Stadium. After losing in the 2013 NCAA Super Regionals, the 2014 team looked to make the postseason for the 16th straight year, and the Women's College World Series for ninth time, where they would lose against the Florida Gators in the championship game. This season represented the 18th season of softball in the school's history.

Roster

2014 Alabama Crimson Tide Softball Roster

Schedule 

|-
!colspan=9| Troy Subway Invitational

 

|-
!colspan=9|Hillenbrand Invitational

|-
!colspan=9|Easton Bama Bash

|-
!colspan=9|
 
|-
!colspan=9|Easton Crimson Classic
 
 
 
 
 
|-
!colspan=9|

|-
!colspan=9|SEC Tournament

|-
!colspan=9|NCAA Tuscaloosa Regional

|-
!colspan=9|NCAA Tuscaloosa Super Regional

|-
!colspan=9|Women's College World Series

|-

Ranking movement

See also
 2014 Alabama Crimson Tide baseball team

References

Alabama
Alabama Crimson Tide softball seasons
Alabama Crimson Tide softball season
2014 NCAA Division I softball tournament participants
Women's College World Series seasons